The Europe/Africa Zone was one of three zones of regional competition in the 2002 Fed Cup.

Group I
Venue: Antalya, Turkey (outdoor clay) 
Date: 24–28 April

The sixteen teams were divided into four pools of four teams. The top teams of each pool played-off against the second-placed teams to decide which four nations progress to World Group Play-offs. The four nations coming last in the pools were relegated to Group II for 2003.

Pools

Play-offs

Group II
Venue: Pretoria, South Africa (outdoor hard) 
Date: 9–13 April

The eighteen teams were divided into two pools each of three teams and four teams. The placing of the teams within the pools determine who they are drawn against in the play-offs.

Pools

Play-offs

See also
Fed Cup structure

References

 Fed Cup Profile, Slovenia
 Fed Cup Profile, Ukraine
 Fed Cup Profile, Belarus
 Fed Cup Profile, Israel
 Fed Cup Profile, Netherlands
 Fed Cup Profile, Romania
 Fed Cup Profile, Bulgaria
 Fed Cup Profile, Estonia
 Fed Cup Profile, Georgia
 Fed Cup Profile, Luxembourg
 Fed Cup Profile, Yugoslavia
 Fed Cup Profile, Poland
 Fed Cup Profile, Great Britain
 Fed Cup Profile, Malta
 Fed Cup Profile, Denmark
 Fed Cup Profile, Lithuania
 Fed Cup Profile, South Africa
 Fed Cup Profile, Latvia
 Fed Cup Profile, Algeria
 Fed Cup Profile, Ireland
 Fed Cup Profile, Finland
 Fed Cup Profile, Egypt

External links
 Fed Cup website

 
Europe Africa
Sport in Antalya
21st century in Antalya
Tennis tournaments in Turkey
Sports competitions in Pretoria
Tennis tournaments in South Africa
2002 in Turkish tennis
2002 in South African tennis